John Adams (1750? – 1814) was a Scottish compiler of books for young readers.

Biography
Adams was born at Aberdeen about 1750. Having graduated at the university there, he obtained a preaching license, and coming to London was appointed minister of the Scotch church in Hatton Garden. Subsequently he opened a school or academy at Putney, which proved very successful; the botanists Allan Cunningham and his brother Richard were pupils. He died at Putney in 1814.

Most of his numerous works passed through many editions, and were largely used in schools. Among them may be mentioned:

 The Flowers of Ancient History, 1788
 Elegant Anecdotes and Bon Mots,’ 1790
 A View of Universal History (3 vols.), 1795, which includes a brief account of almost every country in the world down to the date of publication.
 The Flowers of Modern History, 1796.
 The Flowers of Modern Travels, 1797.
 Curious Thoughts on the History of Man, 1799.

Adams also published by subscription a volume of sermons dedicated to Lord Grantham in 1805, and he was the author of a very popular Latin schoolbook, entitled Lectiones Selectæ, which reached an eleventh edition in 1823.

References

External links

Books by John Adams from the Internet Archive:
The Flowers of Modern History 
The Flowers of Modern Travels volume I
The Flowers of Modern Travels volume II
A View of Universal History, from the Creation to the Present Time
Anecdotes, Bons-mots, and Characteristic Traits of the Greatest Princes, Politicians, etc
A New History of Great Britain from the Invasion of Julius Caesar to the Present Time

1750s births
1814 deaths
British education writers